Wisconsin Lutheran High School, commonly referred to as WLHS or Wisco, is a private preparatory religious high school in Milwaukee, Wisconsin. WLHS was formed when the Lutheran High School in Milwaukee, founded in 1903, split in the 1950s over doctrinal differences. Both resulting schools (WLHS and Milwaukee Lutheran High School) use the 1903 founding date and are thus the oldest Lutheran high schools in the United States. WLHS is owned and operated by various Wisconsin Evangelical Lutheran Synod (WELS) congregations in the Milwaukee area.

History 

In 1903, a group of Lutheran pastors, teachers, and laymen from congregations affiliated with the Wisconsin and Missouri synods started a high school in an unused classroom of Immanuel Lutheran School in Milwaukee with 18 students.) In 1904, it relocated to the former site of the Wisconsin Synod's seminary at 13th and Vine streets. Enrollment increased to 340 in 1929 and led to construction of additional buildings at the site. The Great Depression caused enrollment to decline to 265 in 1938, but with the end of the depression, enrollment steadily increased to 848 in 1948. Plans were initiated to build a larger school at a new site, but doctrinal differences between the two synods resulted in the decision for each synod to build its own separate high school and dissolve the joint operation. The Missouri Synod congregations opened Milwaukee Lutheran High School in September 1955, marking the end of the joint operation of the school. The Wisconsin Synod congregations continued to use the old campus for their school until their new building opened in September 1959.

The Wisconsin Synod congregations formed "The Wisconsin Lutheran High School Convention" in 1952. The convention conducted a study that found that 60% of Wisconsin Synod members lived north of the Menomonee Valley and 40% lived south of it. This meant that either one high school in the middle of the city or both north and south high schools would be needed. Accepting a donation of acreage north of Capitol Drive at about 100th Street would have required the latter option, so the offer was rejected and the convention looked for land in the middle of the city.

Land in Wauwatosa on 76th Street just north of Wisconsin Avenue was purchased, but the city of Wauwatosa subsequently changed the zoning and would not issue the permit for construction even though the convention already held one. Legal challenges going all the way to the U.S. Supreme Court ended with Wauwatosa's position being upheld. A local developer was interested in the 76th Street property for an upscale subdivision. He also owned  on Glenview Drive near Blue Mound Road that he intended to use for apartments. After negotiations, the convention and the developer swapped properties. The Wisconsin Lutheran High School facility, including equipment, cost $2.25 million and was dedicated on September 21, 1959. Until then the convention rented the old Lutheran High School facility after the departure of the Missouri Synod contingent. The old high school was subsequently sold to the city of Milwaukee, who built a fire station there, and the proceeds were divided equally between the two groups.

In 1964, the student body raised $40,000 to install a new Schlicker organ in the school's auditorium. That same year, 13 classrooms were added at a cost of $250,000 to be able to handle the school's originally planned capacity of 1,000 students. The Wisconsin Synod's Milwaukee Lutheran Teachers College used a portion of the building for about ten years. Planning for another addition to handle increased enrollment began in the early 1970s and the $1.5 million cost was paid off by 1989. Another wing housing 12 math and science classrooms, a greenhouse, office areas, a fitness center, and a multi-purpose room was dedicated on April 4, 1998. The $3 million project included remodeling and renovation of the existing building.

Curriculum
Wisconsin Lutheran High School's curriculum includes Advanced Placement courses, Project Lead the Way – a high-level engineering curriculum, and a Resource Center for those who need academic support. WLHS has attained accreditation at the exemplary level through Wisconsin Evangelical Lutheran Synod School Accreditation (WELSSA), Wisconsin Religious and Independent School Association (WRISA), and the National Council for Private School Accreditation (NCPSA).

Student life
Students are required to attend a chapel service for 20 minutes each day. At school dances, students are permitted only to bring a date of the opposite gender. WLHS does not allow pregnant students to appear in any "school-related activities where the general public is present". According to the school's 2018-19 handbook, "the privilege of participation in all school-related activities where the general public is present will be denied for the remainder of the school year" if a student continues enrollment while pregnant. While pregnant students are permitted to participate in their senior graduation service, the administration reserves the right to restrict participation if the student "exhibits an unrepentant or rebellious attitude at some time during the pregnancy or if the student's physical well-being may be at risk", according to the handbook. The handbook does not state any restrictions for male students that caused pregnancy.

PAVE 
Wisconsin Lutheran High School is a PAVE school. PAVE is an independent, non-profit foundation funded through corporate, foundation and individual support. It aims to give low-income families in Milwaukee options when selecting schools for their children.

Athletics
WLHS won state Division III football championships in 2004, 2005, 2007, and 2014. It was runner up in 2003 and 2011. The school won the Division II basketball state championship for the first time in 2009. and again in 2014. The WLHS boys cross country team has won the WIAA Division 2 State Championship three times: in 2011, 2013, and 2014. In 2019 the girls track team made it to state and took home a state champion title for the first time.

The high school's cheerleading program has won nine state championships (1996, 1997, 2001, 2002, 2004, 2006, 2008, 2009, 2010, 2012, and 2015) and in 2009 made it to finals at the National High School Cheerleading Competition in Orlando, Florida. They reached sixth place at the competition. WLHS was also a national finalist in 2011 and 2015.

Extracurricular activities

 FTC Robotics Team 265
 Wisco Witnesses To The World
 Student council
 Mission trips
 Chess
 Page Turners Book Club
 Compass (yearbook)
 Pilot (school newspaper)
 Tech team
 Drama club
 Forensics
 Instrumental and vocal ensembles
 Photo club
 Jubilation Handbell Choir
 Pottery 
 Sewing (Making Own Clothes)

Notable alumni
 David Craig, politician
 Sam Mayer, racing driver
 Mark Wilson, five-time winner on the PGA Tour, class of 1993
 Kevin Zeitler, NFL offensive guard, Baltimore Ravens, class of 2008
 Chris Garrett, NFL linebacker, Los Angeles Rams, class of 2017

References

 The first section of the book (pp. 3–28) is a reprint of  the article of the same name published in two parts in Concordia Historical Institute Quarterly, 33 (4), January 1961, and 34 (1), April 1961.

High schools in Milwaukee
Educational institutions established in 1903
Lutheran schools in Wisconsin
Private high schools in Wisconsin
Secondary schools affiliated with the Wisconsin Evangelical Lutheran Synod
1903 establishments in Wisconsin